Jerzy Czerbniak (born 29 September 1947) is a Polish sprinter. He competed in the men's 4 × 100 metres relay at the 1972 Summer Olympics.

References

1947 births
Living people
Athletes (track and field) at the 1972 Summer Olympics
Polish male sprinters
Olympic athletes of Poland
People from Kutno